Jachaleria was a dicynodont herbivore that lived from the Ladinian to Norian stages of the Middle to Late Triassic, from approximately 240 to 220 million years ago. Jachaleria was one of the last representatives of the dicynodonts, occurring in Argentina and Brazil. It lacked teeth, much like Stahleckeria, but was closer in size to Dinodontosaurus.

Species 
 Jachaleria candelariensis is found near Candelária City, in the Paraná Basin of southeastern Brazil. Throughout the early part of the Upper Triassic dicynodonts were absent from the paleorrota and the rhynchosaurs were the dominant herbivores. At the end of Carnian, however, the rhynchosaurs became extinct and the dicynodonts appear in their place. Jachaleria candelariensis occurs in the Caturrita Formation.
 Jachaleria colorata is found in Argentina, in the Chañares, Ischigualasto and Los Colorados Formations of the Ischigualasto-Villa Unión Basin in northwestern Argentina. It is very similar to Jachaleria candelariensis.

See also 
 List of therapsids

References

Bibliography

External links 
 Sociedade Brasileira de Paleontologia

Kannemeyeriiformes
Ladinian genera
Carnian genera
Norian genera
Late Triassic synapsids of South America
Middle Triassic synapsids of South America
Triassic Argentina
Fossils of Argentina
Chañares Formation
Ischigualasto Formation
Los Colorados Formation
Triassic Brazil
Fossils of Brazil
Paraná Basin
Fossil taxa described in 1971
Taxa named by José Bonaparte
Anomodont genera